Stefania satelles is a species of frog in the family Hemiphractidae.
It is endemic to Venezuela.

This is a nocturnal frog found on tepuis in Canaima National Park. Its natural habitat is open, rocky surfaces, and crevices and depressions close to watercourses. The species has a disjunct distribution. It occurs on Aprada-tepui (the type locality), Angasima-tepui and Upuigma-tepui. It is classed as a near-threatened species because of the restricted area of the summits where it lives.

References

External links

Amphibians of Venezuela
Endemic fauna of Venezuela
Stefania
Taxonomy articles created by Polbot
Amphibians described in 1997
Amphibians of the Tepuis